Qapan-e Olya (also Romanized as Qapān-e ‘Olyā; also known as Qapān-e Bālā and ‘Alī Qapān) is a village in Zavkuh Rural District, Pishkamar District, Kalaleh County, Golestan Province, Iran. At the 2006 census, its population was 648, in 125 families.

References 

Populated places in Kalaleh County